Stoke Talmage is a village and civil parish  south of Thame in Oxfordshire.  The 2001 Census recorded the parish population as 49. Because the parish population is below 100, the 2011 Census combined its figures with the output area for the civil parishes of Adwell and Shirburn.

Notable buildings
Stoke Talmage seems to have had a parish church since the 11th century, although the first clear historical reference to it dates from 1219. The Church of England parish church of Saint Mary Magdalene was restored in 1758. In 1860 it was restored again and extended to plans by George Gilbert Scott.  St Mary Magdalene Rectory was built in 1752. It was extended in 1820 by the builder and architect Daniel Harris.

References

Sources and further reading

External links

Civil parishes in Oxfordshire
Villages in Oxfordshire